Jambongan Island is located on the northern coast of Sabah in Malaysia. It is one of the largest island in Sabah located in Teluk Paitan (Paitan Bay) in the Sandakan Division. Jambongan town is located on the south-east of the island. The highest point on the island is Buli Gantungan Hill, at a height of 156 metres.

See also
 List of islands of Malaysia

References 

Islands of Sabah